The Top Ten of Everything is a British live children's television programme that ran from 1998 to 2000 on CITV. It is presented by Ben Jones and Vanessa Bewley. The show broadcast on Friday afternoons at 4:50 pm.

Features
Top Ten Lists

Top Ten lists were compiled from different sources. Viewers were also given the chance to interact in a poll by phone voting. Different phone numbers were given for each of the choices in the poll, and the final results were recorded and put in order from 1-10. Examples included the tallest buildings, smelliest cheeses, and the highest rollercoasters.

Disgusting Creatures

Each week, a different type of creature would be shown on the show along with a specialist on that animal. The presenters would then go on to hold the animal.

References

1998 British television series debuts
2000 British television series endings
ITV children's television shows
Television series by ITV Studios
Television shows produced by Harlech Television (HTV)
English-language television shows